Deca (International spelling as used by the International Bureau of Weights and Measures; symbol: da) or deka (American spelling) is a decimal unit prefix in the metric system denoting a factor of ten. The term is derived from the Greek  meaning ten.

The prefix was a part of the original metric system in 1795. It is not in very common usage, although the decapascal is occasionally used by audiologists. The decanewton is also encountered occasionally, probably because it is an SI approximation of the kilogram-force. 
Its use is more common in Central Europe. In German, Polish, Czech, Slovak, and Hungarian, deka (or deko) is common, and used in self-standing form, always meaning decagram. 
A runway number typically indicates its magnetic azimuth in decadegrees.

Before the symbol as an SI prefix was standardized as da with the introduction of the International System of Units in 1960, various other symbols were more common, such as dk (e.g., UK and Austria), D (e.g., Germany, Eastern Europe), and Da. For syntactical reasons, the HP 48, 49, 50 series, as well as the HP 39gII and Prime calculators use the unit prefix D.

 1 decametre = 10 metres
 1 decalitre = 10 litres
 1 decare = 10 ares

Examples:
 The blue whale is approximately 30 metres or 3 decametres in length.

See also
Metric prefix

References

External links 

 BIPM website

SI prefixes